Holoterpna pruinosata is a moth of the family Geometridae first described by Otto Staudinger in 1898. It is found in Italy, North Macedonia, Turkey, the Levant and possibly western Iran.

The larvae feed on Ferulago galbanifera (syn. F. campestris) and Foeniculum species. They are yellow with crimson/purple transverse strips.

References

Moths described in 1898
Pseudoterpnini
Moths of Europe